James Gunn's PG Porn is a web series created by brothers James Gunn, Brian Gunn, and Sean Gunn. It consists of a series of pornography spoofs, with a humorous event occurring just before the supposed commencement of pornographic sexual acts. Each episode pairs a mainstream actor with a pornographic actress or model. The tagline is, "For people who love everything about Porn...except the sex".

Production

The initial web episode premiered on Spike.com. Spike subsequently picked up the series for an additional 11 episodes.
 
According to Gunn, the idea was developed in the early 2000s, before short-term Internet-based sketch comedies became popular. Stephen Blackehart of The Good Boys Productions produced the show with Jake Zim and Peter Safran of Safran Digital Group (SDG) for Spike.com.

All episodes are directed by James Gunn and have a score by Tyler Bates. The fifth episode is not hosted on Spike.com. In James Gunn's words this was "because the head of Spike Network FREAKED OUT on the, uh, raunchiness of the content and pulled it down." The video is available on James Gunn's website.

In 2010, French channel Canal+ produced a remake of the series, titled Du hard ou du cochon !.

Episodes

References

External links
Safran Digital Group - Projects
 

2000s American sex comedy television series
2008 web series debuts
2009 web series endings
American comedy web series
Pornographic television shows
Television series created by James Gunn